The Bete language of Nigeria is a nearly extinct language spoken by a small minority of the 3,000 inhabitants of Bete Town, Takum, Taraba State; its speakers have mostly shifted to Jukun Takum. It is close to Lufu.

See also
 Bete people

External links
UNESCO, "Bete: Language profile"

Bibliography

Sources
 Crozier, David H. and Roger M. Blench, editors. 1992. An index of Nigerian languages. Abuja, Nigeria and Dallas: Nigerian Language Development Centre, Department of Linguistics and Nigerian Languages, University of Ilorin, and Summer Institute of Linguistics.

Yukubenic languages
Endangered languages of Africa
Languages of Nigeria
Endangered Niger–Congo languages